Antiquities of the Jews (Ioudaikē archaiologia) is a 20-volume historiographical work, written in Greek, by historian Flavius Josephus in the 13th year of the reign of Roman emperor Flavius Domitian which was around CE 93 or 94. Antiquities of the Jews contains an account of the history of the Jewish people for Josephus' gentile patrons. In the first ten volumes, Josephus follows the events of the Hebrew Bible beginning with the creation of Adam and Eve.

The second ten volumes continues the history of the Jewish people beyond the biblical text and up to the Jewish War, or the First Jewish–Roman War (66 to 73 CE). This work, along with Josephus's other major work, The Jewish War (De Bello Iudaico), provides valuable background material for historians wishing to understand 1st-century CE Judaism and the early Christian period.

Content
Josephus' Antiquities of the Jews is a vital source for the history of the Intertestamental period and the Jewish war against Rome. Antiquities of the Jews is separated into twenty volumes:

In the preface of Antiquities of the Jews, Josephus provides his motivation for composing such a large work. He writes:Now I have undertaken the present work, as thinking it will appear to all the Greeks worthy of their study; for it will contain all our antiquities, and the constitution of our government, as interpreted out of the Hebrew Scriptures.
Josephan scholar Louis Feldman highlights several of the misconceptions about the Jewish people that were being circulated in Josephus' time. In particular, the Jews were thought to lack great historical figures and a credible history of their people. They were also accused of harboring hostility toward non-Jews, and were thought to be generally lacking in loyalty, respect for authority, and charity. With these harsh accusations against the Jews fluttering about the Roman empire, Josephus, set out to provide a Hellenized version of the Jewish history. Such a work is often called an "apologia," as it pleads the case of a group of people or set of beliefs to a larger audience.

In order to accomplish this goal, Josephus omitted certain accounts in the Jewish narrative and even added a Hellenistic "glaze" to his work. For example, the "Song of the Sea" sung by Moses and the people of Israel after their deliverance at the Red Sea is completely omitted in Josephus' text. He does mention, however, that Moses composed a song to God in hexameter—a rather unusual (and Greek) metrical scheme for an ancient Hebrew. Josephus also writes that Abraham taught science to the Egyptians, who in turn taught the Greeks, and that Moses set up a senatorial priestly aristocracy, which like Rome resisted monarchy. Thus, in an attempt to make the Jewish history more palatable to his Greco-Roman audience, the great figures of the biblical stories are presented as ideal philosopher-leaders.

In another example, apparently due to his concern with pagan antisemitism, Josephus omitted the entire episode of the golden calf from his account of the Israelites at Mount Sinai. It has been suggested that he was afraid that the biblical account might be employed by Alexandrian antisemites to lend credence to their allegation that the Jews worshiped an ass's head in the Temple (cf. Apion 2:80, 114, 120; Tacitus, Histories 5:4). He also made discredited allegations that the Ancient Egyptians forced the Jewish slaves to build the pyramids, writing “They [the Egyptian taskmasters] set them also to build pyramids.”.

Josephus also adds a short account of his personal life, Vita, as an appendix to the Judean Antiquities.

Antiquities of the Jews contains a good deal of valuable, sometimes unique, historical material. This applies, for example, to the history of the Hellenistic states, Parthia, Armenia, the Nabatean kingdom, and the Roman Empire. In the Middle Ages and up to modern times the book was considered one of the most important sources in ancient Roman history, along with the works of Titus Livius, Tacitus, Suetonius, and Jerome called Josephus Flavius "Titus Livius of the Greeks". The Jewish Encyclopedia speculates that much of Josephus's writings on Herod the Great and his sons draw from the work of Nicolaus of Damascus, a personal friend of Herod's, whose writings remain largely missing; once Nicolaus's narrative on Herod Archelaus ends, Josephus's narrative becomes less detailed. Josephus admitted being familiar with Nicolaus's work but also rebuked Nicolaus for exaggerating Herod's royal claims and benevolence, where Josephus treated Herod as a tyrant.

The extant copies of this work contain two passages about Jesus and James the Just. The long one has come to be known as the Testimonium Flavianum. Scholars usually agree on the authenticity of the second passage, while the first one is considered to be authentic, but to have been subjected to Christian interpolation.

Manuscripts
The earliest Greek manuscript of Books 11–20 of the Antiquities dates from the eleventh century, the Ambrosianus 370 (F 128); preserved in the Biblioteca Ambrosiana in Milan. However, the manuscript tradition is complex and many manuscripts are incomplete.

The works of Josephus Flavius were popular in late antiquity. Then appeared the translation of "Antiquities of the Jews" into Latin. It is attributed to either Jerome or his contemporary Tyrannius Rufinus. In medieval Europe, "Antiquities of the Jews" circulated widely, mainly in Latin translation.

This work of Joseph Flavius was translated into Old Bulgarian at the Preslav Literary School in the beginning of the 10th century during the time of Simeon the Great.

In the 9th–10th centuries, the so-called "Josippon", written in Hebrew, appeared in Italy. It described the events of world and Jewish history from the time of the construction of the Tower of Babel to the capture of Jerusalem by the Romans in 70 AD. Essentially, this chronicle was an abbreviated translation of Jewish Antiquities and The Jewish War, but Joseph ben Gorion was named the author. Josippon gained no less popularity than Antiquities of the Jews. With the advent of printing, it was published even before this major work of Josephus Flavius in 1476.

Translations
In 1602, Thomas Lodge published an English translation of both the Antiquities and the Wars. This volume amounted to over 800 pages.

The first printed edition of Antiquities of the Jews in Greek appeared in 1544. Other publications followed—1611 and 1634 (Cologne), 1687 (Oxford), 1691 (Leipzig), 1700 (Oxford), 1726 (Leiden), and so on. Already in the 15th–16th centuries, Jewish Antiquities was translated into French, Italian, German and Spanish. The book was published both in modern languages and in Latin. The first Russian translation of Jewish Antiquities appeared in 1781. First Italian translation dates to 1549 in Venice.

One of the best known translations of this work was provided by William Whiston in 1737, which has been in print continuously since then. The Loeb Classical Library published a 1926 translation by Henry St. John Thackeray and Ralph Marcus, normally preferred academically. A cross-reference apparatus for the Works of Josephus and the Biblical canon also exists.

See also  
 Annals (Tacitus)  
 Josephus on Jesus  
 Pseudo-Philo
 Acme (enslaved woman)

References

External links

 Whiston translation of Antiquities of the Jews
 Loeb Classical Library Josephus Volume 4 Antiquities of the Jews Books 1-4
 Loeb Classical Library Josephus Volume 5 Antiquities of the Jews Books 5-8
 Loeb Classical Library Josephus Volume 6 Antiquities of the Jews Books 9-11
 Loeb Classical Library Josephus Volume 7 Antiquities of the Jews Books 12-14
 The Judean Antiquities at PACE
 
 
 Complete works of Josephus. Antiquities of the Jews, Volume One, Books I-VIII
 Complete works of Josephus. Antiquities of the Jews, Volume Two, Books IX-XVI
 Complete works of Josephus. Antiquities of the Jews, Volume Three, Books XVII-XX
 Perseus Digital Library: Greek text alongside Whiston English translation

Works by Josephus
1st-century history books